Night in the City (also known as City Nights) was a 1933 Chinese silent film.

Production background
Night in the City was the directorial debut of Fei Mu (who would later go on to achieve lasting fame throughout the 1930s and 1940s) and starred actress Ruan Lingyu and actor Jin Yan. It was highly acclaimed upon its release, particularly by leftist progressives for its social criticisms of city-life. The film is now considered a lost film.

Plot
The film tells the story of a poor family living in China's slums. The daughter, played by Ruan Lingyu, is forced to work at the docks. When it is learned that the slum's landlord is preparing to demolish the entire tenement, the daughter is forced to give up her body to her landlord's son in exchange for a delay in construction. By the end of the film, the daughter, her family, and the landlord's son all leave the city for what they hope will be a better life in the country.

Preservation
Though lost, parts of the film were "recreated" for scenes in Stanley Kwan's 1991 biographical film on Ruan Lingyu's life and career, Center Stage.

Cast
 Ruan Lingyu
 Jin Yan

See also
List of lost films

References

Bibliography
 Hjort, Mette, Stanley Kwan's center stage, Hong Kong University Press (2007). .
 Hu, Jubin, Projecting a nation: Chinese national cinema before 1949. Hong Kong University Press (2003). .

External links
 Night in the City at the Chinese Movie Database

1933 films
1933 drama films
Films directed by Fei Mu
Lianhua Film Company films
Lost Chinese films
Chinese silent films
Chinese drama films
Chinese black-and-white films
1933 lost films
Lost drama films
1933 directorial debut films
Silent drama films